Bettina S. is a Finnish talk show, hosted by Bettina Sågbom and produced by Yle Fem. The show is also broadcast on Yle TV2. However, the show is ten minutes longer on Yle Fem.

The show premiered in 2003 and in the same year won the Venla prize for Best Entertainment Show of 2003.

Guests
This list is incomplete; only the most famous guests have been mentioned here

 Alcazar
 Bodies Without Organs
 Paulo Coelho
 Jan Guillou
 Ken Hom
 Tomas Ledin
 Helmut Lotti
 Mikael Niemi
 Tina Nordström
 Sara Nunes
 Conan O'Brien
 Outlandish
 Pandora
 Åsne Seierstad
 Sri Sri Ravi Shankar
 Anna Strömberg (Miss Finland 2003)
 Titiyo
 Christian Walz
 Within Temptation
 Jane Fonda
 Hanoi Rocks

Staff
 Host - Bettina Sågbom
 Producer - Robert Portman
 Michael Cronström
 Lissu Litmanen
 Pia Stråhlman

References

Finland-Swedish television shows
Finnish television shows
2000s Finnish television series
2003 Finnish television series debuts
Yle original programming